Events from the year 2013 in Brazil.

Incumbents

Federal government
 President – Dilma Rousseff
 Vice President – Michel Temer
 President of the Chamber of Deputies – Henrique Eduardo Alves
 President of the Senate – Renan Calheiros

Governors
 Acre – Tião Viana
 Alagoas – Teotônio Vilela Filho
 Amapa – Camilo Capiberibe
 Amazonas – Omar Aziz
 Bahia – Jaques Wagner
 Ceará – Cid Gomes
 Espírito Santo – Renato Casagrande
 Goiás – Marconi Perillo
 Maranhão – Roseana Sarney
 Mato Grosso – Silval da Cunha
 Mato Grosso do Sul – André Puccinelli
 Minas Gerais – Antônio Anastasia
 Pará – Simão Jatene
 Paraíba – Ricardo Coutinho
 Paraná – Beto Richa
 Pernambuco – Eduardo Campos
 Piauí – Wilson Martins
 Rio de Janeiro – 
 Rio Grande do Norte – Rosalba Ciarlini Rosado
 Rio Grande do Sul – Tarso Genro
 Rondônia – Confúcio Moura
 Roraima – José de Anchieta Júnior
 Santa Catarina – Raimundo Colombo
 São Paulo – Geraldo Alckmin
 Sergipe – Marcelo Déda (until 2 December), Jackson Barreto (starting 2 December)
 Tocantins – José Wilson Siqueira Campos

Vice governors
 Acre –	Carlos César Correia de Messias
 Alagoas – José Thomaz da Silva Nonô Neto
 Amapá – Doralice Nascimento de Souza
 Amazonas – José Melo de Oliveira
 Bahia – Otto Alencar
 Ceará – Domingos Gomes de Aguiar Filho
 Espírito Santo – Givaldo Vieira da Silva
 Goiás – José Eliton de Figueiredo Júnior
 Maranhão – Joaquim Washington Luiz de Oliveira
 Mato Grosso – Francisco Tarquínio Daltro
 Mato Grosso do Sul – Simone Tebet
 Minas Gerais – Alberto Pinto Coelho Júnior
 Pará – Helenilson Cunha Pontes
 Paraíba – Rômulo José de Gouveia
 Paraná – Flávio José Arns
 Pernambuco – João Soares Lyra Neto
 Piauí – Wilson Martins
 Rio de Janeiro – Luiz Fernando Pezão
 Rio Grande do Norte – Robinson Faria
 Rio Grande do Sul – Jorge Alberto Duarte Grill
 Rondônia – Airton Pedro Gurgacz
 Roraima – Francisco de Assis Rodrigues
 Santa Catarina – Eduardo Pinho Moreira
 São Paulo – Guilherme Afif Domingos
 Sergipe – Jackson Barreto
 Tocantins – João Oliveira de Sousa

Events
 2013 protests in Brazil
January 27 - A nightclub fire in Santa Maria, Rio Grande do Sul kills at least 242 people.
May 7 -  removed from office, the presidency of the Legislative Assembly of Mato Grosso, accused of embezzling $4.7 million.
July 23
 World Youth Day began in Rio de Janeiro.
 By the first time since 1975, snows in Curitiba.
November 14 - National Institute for Space Research (INPE) satellite data revealed a 30% increase of deforestation in the Amazon in 2013.

Deaths
January 10 – Jorge Selarón, 65, painter and ceramist (Escadaria Selarón).
January 15 – Clayton Silva, 74, actor and comedian (A Praça é Nossa), cancer.
January 18 – Walmor Chagas, 82, actor (Xica da Silva, São Paulo, Sociedade Anônima), apparent suicide by gunshot.
January 22 – Lídia Mattos, 88, actress, pneumonia.
January 24 – Zózimo Bulbul, 75, actor (Quilombo, Sagarana: The Duel) and filmmaker, heart attack.
February 14 – Fernando Lyra, 74, politician, Minister of Justice (1985–1986), cardiopathy.
March 6 – Chorão, 42, musician (Charlie Brown Jr.), cocaine overdose.
March 20 – Emílio Santiago, 66, singer, complications from a stroke.
April 8 – Waldemar Esteves da Cunha, 92, carnival king, respiratory failure and Alzheimer's disease.
April 15 – Cleyde Yáconis, 89, film, stage and television actress, ischemia.
April 28 – Paulo Vanzolini, 89, zoologist, poet and samba composer (Onze sambas e uma capoeira), complications of pneumonia.
April 30 – Tito Buss, 87, Roman Catholic prelate, Bishop of Rio do Sul (1969–2000).
May 5 – Peu Sousa, 35, guitarist (Nove Mil Anjos, Pitty) and record producer, suicide by hanging.
May 26 – Roberto Civita, 76, businessman, CEO of Grupo Abril, heart failure.
May 28 – Silvério Paulo de Albuquerque, 96, Roman Catholic prelate, Bishop of Caetité (19701973) and Feira de Santana (19731995).
June 3 – Eugênio Izecksohn, 81, herpetologist (Izecksohn's Toad), professor and author.
June 5 – Scarlet Moon de Chevalier, 62, actress, journalist and writer, multiple system atrophy.
June 7 – Malu Rocha, 65, actress, prion.
June 12 
José de Lima, 89, Roman Catholic prelate, Bishop of Itumbiara (19731981) and Sete Lagoas (19811999).
Teodoro Matos Santana, 66, footballer (São Paulo FC), pancreatic cancer.
June 15 – Tatiana Belinky, 94, children's writer
June 21 – Marcelo Grassmann, 88, engraver and draughtsman.
June 26  
Edward Huggins Johnstone, 91, Brazilian-born American judge, member of the US District Court for Western Kentucky (since 1977).
Nilton Pacheco, 92, Olympic basketball player (1948).
July 7 – MC Daleste, 20, rapper, shot.
July 8 – Claudiney Ramos, 33, Brazilian-born Equatorial Guinean footballer, malaria.
July 13 – Bertha Becker, 82, geographer.
July 23
Dominguinhos, 72, composer and singer, infection and cardiac complications.
Djalma Santos, 84, footballer, two-time World Cup winner (1958, 1962), complications from pneumonia. 
August 2 – Fernando Flávio Marques de Almeida, 97, geologist.
August 5 – Jaime Luiz Coelho, 97, Roman Catholic prelate, Bishop and Archbishop of Maringá (1956–1997).
August 10 – Joaquim Rufino do Rêgo, 87, Roman Catholic prelate, Bishop of Quixadá (1971–1986) and Parnaíba (1986–2001).
August 13 – Rui Moreira Lima, 94, military fighter pilot.
August 24 – Newton de Sordi, 82, World Cup champion footballer (1958), multiple organ dysfunction syndrome.
August 25 – Gylmar dos Santos Neves, 83, World Cup champion footballer (1958, 1962), complications from a heart attack.
September 1 – Joaquim Justino Carreira, 63, Roman Catholic prelate, Bishop of Guarulhos (since 2011).
September 9 – Champignon, 35, musician (Charlie Brown Jr., Revolucionnários, A Banca), suicide by firearm.
September 13 – Luiz Gushiken, 63, politician and union leader, member of the Chamber of Deputies (1987–1999); Minister of Communications (2003–2005), cancer.
September 27 – Oscar Castro-Neves, 73, bossa nova musician.

See also 
2013 in Brazilian football

References

 
2010s in Brazil
Years of the 21st century in Brazil
Brazil
Brazil